The Neilson House is a historic house located on CR 234 in Windsor, Florida. It is locally significant as a singularly fine example of a style of architecture which is exceptionally rare in Florida.

Description and history 
The Neilson House is a mortise-and-tenon system of wood-frame construction. Posts and beams are fairly thick in section) creating a rigid frame which requires little diagonal bracing. The house is somewhat irregular in plan particularly in its system of porches and verandas. The rooms, however, present an ordered interior space as they all lie off of a central hall running the entire depth of the house.

It was added to the National Register of Historic Places on June 4, 1973.

References

External links
 Alachua County listings at National Register of Historic Places
 Alachua County listings at Florida's Office of Cultural and Historical Programs
 Kelly-Neilson House info and video at Alachua County's Department of Growth Management

Houses on the National Register of Historic Places in Florida
National Register of Historic Places in Alachua County, Florida
Houses in Alachua County, Florida
Houses completed in 1890